A point source is a localised, relatively small source of something.

Point source may also refer to:
Point source (pollution), a localised (small) source of pollution
Point source water pollution, water pollution with a localized source
Point mass, a point source of gravitational field